Pedro Ramsey Nijem (born April 1, 1988) is an American retired mixed martial artist. A professional MMA competitor from 2008 to 2021, Nijem is perhaps best known for his 10-fight stint in the Ultimate Fighting Championship. He was a finalist on The Ultimate Fighter: Team Lesnar vs. Team dos Santos and also competed in the Professional Fighters League (PFL).

Early life
A Palestinian American, Nijem was born in Concord, California, but raised in Mill Creek, Washington with two brothers. He attended Henry M. Jackson High School from 2002 through 2006. During those years, Nijem was a part of his high school's soccer, cross-country, and wrestling teams. His senior season in wrestling he went 27-5 and earned "Wrestler of the Year" honors. He was also wrestling captain for his junior and senior seasons.

After high school, Nijem enrolled in Utah Valley University, also wrestling for the school. Nijem graduated with a degree in business management in 2010.

MMA career
Nijem began his training with Riven Academy of MMA in 2008. Electing to skip an amateur career, Nijem made his pro debut April 18, 2008 defeating Ryan Miller via first round rear-naked choke submission. After taking a nineteen-month hiatus from the sport, he returned losing to Gordon Bell via an armbar submission only 21 seconds into the first round.

Only a month after his first loss he defeated Logan Hancock via unanimous decision, bring his professional record to 2-1. Ramzi recorded his first TKO win in April 2010, defeating Eric Uresk at Showdown Fights: Burkman vs. Paul. He made his lightweight debut against Scott Casey, winning the fight via first round submission.

In June, 2011 at his UFC debut at the TUF 13 finale, Nijem walked out to the Matisyahu song "One Day." His choice of music was significant due to Nijem's Palestinian background and Matisyahu's Orthodox Jewish background, and the moment has been recognized for its "diplomatic initiative and message centered on peace."

Ramzi is now the Head MMA Coach at Ultimate Combat Training Center in Salt Lake City, Utah. Ramzi is also the Coach of the Fight Team there, and trains many fighters that compete in and around the state of Utah, and beyond.

The Ultimate Fighter
In 2011, Nijem had signed with the UFC to compete in The Ultimate Fighter: Team Lesnar vs. Team dos Santos.

Nijem was picked fourth on Team dos Santos and eighth overall. In the fourth preliminary match-up, Nijem was selected to fight Bellator veteran, Charlie Rader. In the first round Nijem controlled the fight by putting Rader on the fence, and obtaining a few last minute take downs. In the second round Nijem was able to take Rader down early and lock in a fight ending rear naked choke.

Nijem was selected to fight Clay Harvison in the quarterfinals. Nijem went on to win the fight by rear naked choke less than a minute in. In the semifinals, Nijem fought Chris Cope, defeating him via TKO in round two. The win moved him into the live finale for the chance to become the winner of The Ultimate Fighter.

Ultimate Fighting Championship
Nijem made his official UFC debut on June 4, 2011 at The Ultimate Fighter 13 Finale against Tony Ferguson to crown the winner of The Ultimate Fighter 13. Nijem lost the bout via KO in the first round after getting caught flush by a left hook. After the bout Nijem signed a nine-fight contract with the UFC.

Nijem defeated Danny Downes on October 29, 2011 at UFC 137 via unanimous decision (30-25, 30-26, 30-27).

Nijem was expected to face Anthony Njokuani on December 30, 2011 at UFC 141.  However, Nijem was forced out of the bout, citing an injury and replaced by Danny Castillo.

Nijem faced promotional newcomer C.J. Keith on June 22, 2012 at UFC on FX 4. He won the fight via TKO in the first round.

Nijem faced Joe Proctor on December 8, 2012 at UFC on Fox 5. He won the fight via unanimous decision.

Nijem faced Myles Jury on April 20, 2013 at UFC on Fox 7. He lost the fight via knockout in the second round.

Nijem fought James Vick on August 17, 2013 at UFC Fight Night 26. He lost the fight via submission at 58 seconds in the first round.

Nijem next faced fellow TUF alumni and teammate Justin Edwards on January 15, 2014 at UFC Fight Night 35. He won the fight via unanimous decision.

Nijem faced Beneil Dariush on April 11, 2014 at UFC Fight Night 39. He won the fight via TKO in the first round.  The win also won Nijem his first Performance of the Night bonus award.

Nijem faced Carlos Diego Ferreira on August 30, 2014 at UFC 177. He lost the back-and-forth fight via TKO in the second round.  Despite the loss, Nijem was awarded his first Fight of the Night bonus award.

Nijem was expected to face Erik Koch on July 25, 2015 at UFC on Fox 16. However, Koch was forced from the bout with injury and replaced by promotional newcomer Andrew Holbrook.  Holbrook defeated Nijem by split decision.  15 of 15 media outlets scored the decision in favor of Nijem.

On October 2, 2015, it was announced that Nijem was cut from the UFC roster.

World Series of Fighting
On August 29, 2016 it was announced that Nijem had signed a multi-fight deal with World Series of Fighting.

The Ultimate Fighter: Redemption
In February 2017, it was revealed that Nijem would compete again on the UFC's reality show in the 25th season on The Ultimate Fighter: Redemption. Nijem was the third pick overall for Team Dillashaw. He defeated Julian Lane in the opening round by TKO in the first round.

Professional Fighters League
On March 23, 2018 it was revealed that Nijem has signed a contract with Professional Fighters League (PFL). In his debut, he faced Brian Foster at PFL 2 on June 21, 2018. He lost the fight via TKO in the third round.

On October 13, 2018, Nijem faced Yuki Kawana at PFL 9. He won the fight via unanimous decision.

Season 2
In May 2019, Nijem was expected to face Ronys Torres at PFL 2, but Torres was forced to withdraw on the fight week. By PFL rules, Nijem was declared the winner by walkover.

Nijem was expected to face reigning PFL lightweight tournament winner Natan Schulte on PFL 5, but could not make weight and was disqualified and removed from the card. Afterwards it was revealed that Nijem failed a drug test for marijuana and was temporarily suspended until disciplinary hearing. Nevada State Athletic Commission eventually suspended Nijem for nine months.

Nijem was rebooked against Natan Schulte in the lightweight quarterfinals at PFL 8 on October 17, 2019, losing the bout after being choked out by rear-naked choke in under a minute.

Post PFL 
Nijem faced Ben Saunders on July 30, 2021 at XMMA 2. He lost the bout via unanimous decision and subsequently retired in early August.

Championships and accomplishments

Mixed martial arts
Ultimate Fighting Championship
The Ultimate Fighter 13 Tournament Runner Up
Fight of the Night (One time) 
Performance of the Night (One time)

Mixed martial arts record

|-
|Loss
|align=center|10–9
|Ben Saunders
|Decision (unanimous)
|XMMA 2: Saunders vs. Nijem
|
|align=center|3
|align=center|5:00
|Greenville, South Carolina, United States
|   
|-
|Loss
|align=center|10–8
|Natan Schulte
|Submission (rear-naked choke)
|PFL 8
|
|align=center| 1
|align=center| 0:52
|Las Vegas, Nevada, United States
|
|-
|Win
|align=center|10–7
|Yuki Kawana
|Decision (unanimous)
| PFL 9
| 
| align=center| 2
| align=center| 5:00
| Long Beach, California, United States
| 
|-
| Loss
| align=center|9–7
| Brian Foster
| TKO (knee and punches)
| PFL 2
| 
| align=center| 3
| align=center| 0:32
| Chicago, Illinois, United States
| 
|-
| Loss
|align=center|9–6
|Andrew Holbrook
| Decision (split)
|UFC on Fox: Dillashaw vs. Barão 2
|
|align=center|3
|align=center|5:00
|Chicago, Illinois, United States
|
|-
|Loss
|align=center|9–5
|Carlos Diego Ferreira
|TKO (punches)
| UFC 177
| 
| align=center|2
| align=center|1:53
| Sacramento, California, United States
| 
|-
|Win
|align=center|9–4
|Beneil Dariush
|TKO (punches)
| UFC Fight Night: Nogueira vs. Nelson
| 
| align=center| 1
| align=center| 4:20
| Abu Dhabi, United Arab Emirates
| 
|-
|Win
|align=center|8–4
|Justin Edwards
|Decision (unanimous)
|UFC Fight Night: Rockhold vs. Philippou
|
|align=center|3
|align=center|5:00
|Duluth, Georgia, United States
|
|-
|Loss
|align=center|7–4
|James Vick
|Submission (guillotine choke)
|UFC Fight Night: Shogun vs. Sonnen
|
|align=center|1
|align=center|0:58
|Boston, Massachusetts, United States
|
|-
|Loss
|align=center|7–3
|Myles Jury
|KO (punch)
|UFC on Fox: Henderson vs. Melendez
|
|align=center|2
|align=center|1:02
|San Jose, California, United States
|
|-
|Win
|align=center|7–2
|Joe Proctor
|Decision (unanimous)
|UFC on Fox: Henderson vs. Diaz
|
|align=center|3
|align=center|5:00
|Seattle, Washington, United States
|
|-
|Win
|align=center|6–2
|C.J. Keith
|TKO (punches)
|UFC on FX: Maynard vs. Guida
|
|align=center|1
|align=center|2:29
|Atlantic City, New Jersey, United States
|
|-
|Win
|align=center|5–2
|Danny Downes
|Decision (unanimous)
|UFC 137
|
|align=center|3
|align=center|5:00
|Las Vegas, Nevada, United States
|
|-
|Loss
|align=center|4–2
|Tony Ferguson
|KO (punches)
|The Ultimate Fighter: Team Lesnar vs. Team dos Santos Finale
|
|align=center|1
|align=center|3:54
|Las Vegas, Nevada, United States
|
|-
|Win
|align=center|4–1 
|Scott Casey
|Submission (rear-naked choke) 
|Showdown Fights: Respect 
|
|align=center|1
|align=center|2:48
|Orem, Utah, United States
|
|-
|Win
|align=center|3–1
|Eric Uresk
|TKO (punches)
|Showdown Fights: Burkman vs. Paul 
|
|align=center|2
|align=center|4:02
|Orem, Utah, United States
|
|-
|Win
|align=center|2–1
|Logan Hancock
|Decision (unanimous) 
|Throwdown Showdown 5: Homecoming  
|
|align=center|3
|align=center|5:00
|Orem, Utah, United States
|
|-
|Loss
|align=center|1–1
|Gordon Bell
|Submission (armbar)
|Xtreme Combat
|
|align=center|1
|align=center|0:21
|Richfield, Utah, United States
|
|-
|Win
|align=center|1–0
|Ryan Miller
|Submission (rear-naked choke)
|Throwdown Showdown 1
|
|align=center|1
|align=center|2:15
|Orem, Utah, United States
|

Mixed martial arts exhibition record

|-
|Loss
|align=center|4–1
|James Krause
|Decision (unanimous)
| rowspan=2|The Ultimate Fighter: Redemption
| (airdate)
|align=center|3
|align=center|5:00
| rowspan=2|Las Vegas, Nevada, United States
|
|-
|Win
|align=center|4–0
|Julian Lane
|TKO (punches)
| (airdate)
|align=center|1
|align=center|4:44
|
|-
|Win
|align=center|3–0
|Chris Cope
|TKO (punches)
|rowspan=3|The Ultimate Fighter 13
| (airdate)
|align=center|2
|align=center|1:49
|rowspan=3|Las Vegas, Nevada, United States
|
|-
|win
|align=center|2–0
|Clay Harvison
|Submission (rear-naked choke)
| (airdate)
|align=center|1
|align=center|0:56
|
|-
|Win
|align=center|1–0
|Charlie Rader
|Submission (rear-naked choke) 
| (airdate)
|align=center|2
| align=center|3:31
|

See also
 List of current UFC fighters
 List of male mixed martial artists

References

External links

Official UFC Profile

1988 births
Living people
People from Concord, California
American male mixed martial artists
Mixed martial artists from California
Mixed martial artists from Washington (state)
American people of Palestinian descent
People from Mill Creek, Washington
Lightweight mixed martial artists
Welterweight mixed martial artists
Mixed martial artists utilizing collegiate wrestling
Mixed martial artists utilizing kajukenbo
American kajukenbo practitioners
American male sport wrestlers